Del Sol is a metro station on the Line 5 of the Santiago Metro, in Santiago, Chile. The station is named for the nearby Autopista del Sol. The station was opened on 3 February 2011 as part of the extension of the line from Pudahuel to Plaza de Maipú.

Large rectangular pillars support the upper levels. The station features a caterpillar-shaped street-level bus area, which is covered by a fiberglass-reinforced PVC fabric membrane roof.

References

Santiago Metro stations
Railway stations opened in 2011
Santiago Metro Line 5